Ponce Lions may refer to:
Leones de Ponce (baseball), a baseball team in the Puerto Rican Professional Baseball League, Ponce, Puerto Rico
Ponce Lions (basketball), a basketball team in the National Superior Basketball League, Ponce, Puerto Rico